Sir Robert Bruce Lockhart Burnside (26 July 1833 – 10 August 1909) was the 16th Chief Justice of Ceylon and 25th Queen's Advocate of Ceylon.

Career

He served as the Speaker of the House of Assembly of the Bahamas from November 1866 to February 1867. 

He was appointed Chief Justice of Ceylon on 21 May 1883 succeeding Jacobus de Wet and served as Chief Justice until 1889. He was succeeded by John Winfield Bonser.

Harry Dias Bandaranaike acted as Chief Justice from 9 January to 6 June 1888 when Burnside and Lovell Clarence went on leave. Clarence acted from November 1890 to February 1891 when Burnside and Bandaranaike retired.

Personal life
Burnside was born to John and Mary Burnside. His son Robert Bruce Burnside was a judge on the Supreme Court of Western Australia.

References

Chief Justices of British Ceylon
19th-century Sri Lankan people
20th-century Sri Lankan people
Sri Lankan people of British descent
British expatriates in Sri Lanka
19th-century British people
1833 births
1909 deaths
Attorneys General of British Ceylon
People from Nassau, Bahamas
Speakers of the House of Assembly of the Bahamas